is a Japanese actress.

Selected filmography
 The Excitement of the Do-Re-Mi-Fa Girl (1985)
 Tampopo (1985)
Cure (1997)
 Charisma (1999)
 Tomie (1999) as Dr. Hosono
 20th Century Boys 2: the last hope (2009)
 Yuriko, Dasvidaniya (2011)

External links

Yoriko Douguchi fansite, the fansite approved by Yoriko Doguchi (English pages available)

1965 births
Living people
Actresses from Tokyo